Greenbank is a residential district of south Edinburgh, Scotland. It is situated between the districts of Morningside and Oxgangs, i.e. slightly to the south-west of the heart of Morningside.

The older part of Greenbank consists largely of inter-war period detached houses and bungalows. Since 2003, modern flats and houses have been constructed on the site of the former City Hospital on Greenbank Drive, some of which incorporate parts of the Victorian contagious diseases isolation hospital. The area of the new development has become known as Greenbank Village.

Public transport 
Public Transport is frequent with Lothian Buses operating scheduled services. Bus routes 5, 16, and 23 plus night service N16 all serve the area.

Areas of Edinburgh